Songs is the fourth album by the American psychedelic soul group Rotary Connection issued in May 1969 on Cadet Records.

Covers
Rotary Connection covered artists such as Cream, The Band, Otis Redding, Muddy Waters, The Rolling Stones and Jimi Hendrix on the album.

Track listing
 "Respect" (Otis Redding) – 3:05
 "The Weight" (Robbie Robertson) – 3:24
 "Sunshine of Your Love" (Pete Brown, Jack Bruce, Eric Clapton) – 5:07
 "I've Got My Mojo Working" (Preston "Red" Foster) – 2:38
 "Burning of the Midnight Lamp" (Jimi Hendrix) – 4:40
 "Tales of Brave Ulysses" (Eric Clapton, Martin Sharp) – 4:28
 "This Town" (Stevie Wonder) – 3:25
 "We're Going Wrong" (Jack Bruce) – 3:20
 "Salt of the Earth" (Mick Jagger, Keith Richards) – 4:55

(Note: times are taken from the original album sleeve.)

Personnel 
Rotary Connection
 Sidney Barnes
 Minnie Riperton 
 John Stocklin
 Kenny Venegas
 Bobby Simms
 John Jeremiah
 Mitch Aliotta
Technical 
 Marshall Chess, Charles Stepney - producer 
 Charles Stepney - arranger
 Ron Malo - engineer
 Linn Erlich - photography 
 Randy Harter - album design

References

1969 albums
Rotary Connection albums
Albums arranged by Charles Stepney
Albums produced by Marshall Chess
Albums produced by Charles Stepney
Cadet Records albums